The following ships of the Indian Navy have been named INS Nirbhik:

Indian Navy ship names